Roland Sebastian Martin (born November 14, 1968) is an American journalist. He was a commentator for TV One, the host of News One Now, and Washington on Watch With Roland S. Martin.

He was also a CNN contributor, appearing on a variety of shows, including The Situation Room, Anderson Cooper's AC360, and many others. In October 2008, he joined the Tom Joyner Morning Show as senior analyst.   He currently hosts a web series, Roland Martin Unfiltered on YouTube.

Books authored by Martin include Speak, Brother! A Black Man's View of America, Listening to the Spirit Within: 50 Perspectives on Faith and The First: President Barack Obama's Road to the White House as originally reported by Roland S. Martin and, " White Fear: How the Browning of America is Making White Folks Lose Their Minds"

Life and career
Martin was born in Houston, Texas. His maternal great-grandparents had migrated from Haiti to Louisiana, where his family originates. He graduated with a B.S. in journalism from Texas A&M University and a master's degree in Christian communications from Louisiana Baptist University.  

He is the former executive editor of the Chicago Defender.

From 2005 to 2008, Martin hosted a morning radio talk show on WVON in Chicago, and was with CNN as a contributor from 2007 to 2013. He guest-hosted Campbell Brown: No Bias, No Bull while Brown was on maternity leave in April and May 2009.

He became the host of TV One's first Sunday News show Washington Watch with Roland Martin in 2009. It ran for 4 years and is currently off the air.

In March 2013, Martin announced on Twitter that he was leaving CNN. His last day was on April 6, 2013.

It was announced on July 9, 2013, that Martin would be the host of TV One's first live one-hour, weekday morning news program titled News One Now. The program premiered on November 4, 2013. On December 7, 2017, Martin announced on air that TV One had canceled the show due to low ratings from Black viewers, but that he would still remain involved with the network. On January 14, 2018, it was announced that Martin had won two NAACP Image Awards for the show.

Also, Roland hosted a three-hour radio show called The Roland Martin Show. He currently hosts a web series, Roland Martin Unfiltered on YouTube.

Issues
Martin has defended Michael Steele and other black Republicans against charges of being "Uncle Toms", arguing that the label is inappropriate.

Controversy
On February 5, 2012, Roland Martin's Twitter account responded to an underwear advertisement featuring the association football player David Beckham, stating "If a dude at your Super Bowl party is hyped about David Beckham's H&M underwear ad, smack the ish out of him!" GLAAD (the Gay and Lesbian Alliance Against Defamation) responded on its website: “Martin’s tweets today advocating violence against gay people weren’t an accident — they are a part of a larger pattern for Martin. Anti-gay violence in America is a serious problem". In response to the tweets, it was reported that Roland Martin had been suspended by CNN for the controversial remarks. His suspension was lifted on March 14, 2012.

In 2016, Martin was revealed to have leaked CNN town hall questions to former DNC Chair Donna Brazile, who then leaked them to Hillary Clinton's camp when he was acting as guest-moderator. According to Politico, in an email the day before the March town hall to senior Clinton staffers, then DNC Chair Donna Brazile wrote: “From time to time I get the questions in advance” and included the text of a question about the death penalty. An email later obtained by Politico showed that the text of the question Brazile sent to the Clinton campaign was identical to a proposed question Martin had offered CNN.

List of broadcasts
 Washington Watch with Roland Martin (2009-2013)
 News One Now (2013-2017)
 The Roland Martin Show (2016, radio)
 Roland Martin Unfiltered (2018–present)

Articles
"What would Jesus really do?"
"The new reality for Bush and the Democrats"
"Obama Birth Issue is Nutty"
"Roland Martin is on Watch"

References

External links

 
 Roland Martin Features on Ascots at Creators Syndicate
 Podcasts of Martin's recent articles
 TV ONE website for Washington Watch with Roland Martin
 CNN suspends Roland Martin for Super Bowl tweets

1968 births
Living people
African-American writers
African-American journalists
African-American television personalities
American Protestants
American male non-fiction writers
People from Houston
Radio personalities from Chicago
Texas A&M University alumni
Louisiana Baptist University alumni
American people of Haitian descent
Journalists from Texas
People from Leesburg, Virginia
CNN people
21st-century African-American people
20th-century African-American people